K. Prasanna Pandian also known as PP, is an artist, architect and an animator from Tamil Nadu in south India. He was born in Madurai, Tamil Nadu in 1984, and is the founder-director of Archinfinitum, an architectural firm. He has won many awards and titles in the field of art and architecture and is good in interior design and landscape architecture. He was also introduced to the Tamil cinema industry as a music director. He finished his B.Arch at Measi Academy of Architecture, Chennai, while his schooling was at Madurai, Mahatma Montessori Matriculation Higher Secondary School.

Early life 
Prasanna was born in Madurai, India where he completed his schooling, after which he completed his Bachelor of Architecture at the Measi Academy of Architecture, Chennai and then his Master of Architecture at Sathyabama University, Chennai, India.

Awards
Awards in the field of Architecture:
Birla White – Yuva Rathna Award – All India - 2nd GRC category – 2004-2005
Birla White – Yuva Rathna Award – Commendation Flooring category – 2004-2005
Birla White – Yuva Rathna Award – Zone (south) - 1st GRC category – 2005-2006
Birla White – Yuva Rathna Award – State - 1st Flooring category – 2005-2006
Jindal Stainless Steel Award – Commendation – 2005
A+D the Strokes Furniture Design Award – Commendation – 2005
Archi Design Perspectives – Top 10th Position – All India – 2005
Johnson Ties – Finalist – State LvL – 2005
Saint Gobain – Finalist – All India – 2006

Awards in the Field of Art:                                     
Best Artist Award, Mahatma, Madurai - 2001

References
Winners of the Birla White Yuva Ratna Awards 2006
Graduation day at architecture academy, The Hindu (25 March 2006).
Stainless Innovation Awards Results, Jindal Stainless.
Design Ideas Competition 2005 winners, ArchiDesign Perspective.
, KODES Design Consultants Private LTD.

20th-century Indian architects
Sathyabama Institute of Science and Technology alumni
Artists from Madurai
1984 births
Living people